LMS diesel shunters 7055/6 were built by Hudswell Clarke. They were initially allocated numbers 7405/7406 but these numbers were never carried. Testing started in August 1934. One locomotive was taken into LMS stock in December 1934 and the other in October 1935.

Conversion
They were withdrawn from normal service in April/May 1939 and subsequently converted to mobile power units, emerging in their new guise as MPU2/MPU1 in May 1940/October 1940 respectively. MPU2 (7055) was later allocated to the Eastern Region of British Railways, where it was identified as number 953 in their departmental vehicle series.

Scrapping
They were scrapped in February 1964/January 1956 respectively, though due to administrative errors, the disposal of 953 (7055) was not recorded and it was initially allocated number 968004 in the new departmental locomotive series introduced in 1968.

See also
 LMS diesel shunters

7055
Diesel shunter 7055
Hudswell Clarke locomotives
C locomotives
Railway locomotives introduced in 1934
Standard gauge locomotives of Great Britain
Scrapped locomotives